Who Done It? is a 1956 British slapstick black and white comedy crime film directed by Basil Dearden and starring Benny Hill, Belinda Lee, David Kossoff, Garry Marsh, and George Margo. One of the last Ealing comedies, it was Benny Hill's film debut.

Who Done It? opened at the New Victoria and Dominion Cinemas in London on 18 March 1956 before entering general release.

Plot
Hugo Dill is an ice rink sweeper, who accidentally gets involved in the show, causing much catastrophe.

He dreams of being a private investigator. He goes to a gun-shop to buy a revolver, but his acting as a robber while the shopkeeper is in the back gets him mistaken for a robber and almost arrested.

He hires a room in a casting agency causing some confusion with his new clients.

He wins a cash prize and a bloodhound in a sleuthing contest and sets up as a private eye.

A group of Soviet spies employ him to impersonate a scientist to trick the world into thinking the scientist is dead (they plan to blow him up). Hugo is helped by his blonde friend, Frankie, a female strength act, who tags along with him.

Throughout all, Hugo has continual run-ins with the police. Disguising himself as a woman to further evade the police, Hugo is mistaken for the guest star on a TV programme: "Your Birthday Wish".

In the final scene the spies steal a Watney's beer lorry (shaped like a barrel) and are pursued by Hugo and Frankie in a car – plus the police chasing all. They end up on a stock car racing circuit which provides an all-action ending.

Cast

Production
It was one of the last films shot at Ealing Studios and also one of the last Ealing movies distributed by Rank. Filming started in September 1955 and took 50 days of which Hill was required for 47. Writer TEB Clarke spent months studying Hill's technique on TV and the halls and created the script to showcase Hill's ability of mimicry. Basil Dearden said Hill was "an inventive chap. Full of suggestions." Hill said "yes and they're so good that he's turned them all down." Belinda Lee was finishing The Feminine Touch while the shooting began on Who Done It?.

It was one of several comedies Lee made while under contract at Rank.

Reception
Variety said "There is plenty to please the fans of tv comic Benny Hill in this rollicking slapstick comedy, but the situations and stock ingredients are corny and unlikely to make the grade with more fastidious picturegoers. Pic will cash in with the lower bracket audiences and nabe houses... [Hill] exploits his fatuous personality to the full, while Belinda Lee, as his casually acquired femme friend, 
lends fleeting glamour to an almost allmale background... Seasoned players supply convincing support in contrasting roles, and the whole is briskly welded together."

References

External links

 

1956 films
Ealing Studios films
1956 comedy films
Films directed by Basil Dearden
Films set in London
British comedy films
1950s English-language films
1950s British films
British black-and-white films